Voyage in Time is a 63-minute feature documentary that documents the travels in Italy of the director Andrei Tarkovsky with the script writer Tonino Guerra in preparation for the making of his film Nostalghia. In addition to the preparation of Nostalghia, their conversations cover a wide range of matters, filmmaking or not. Notably, Tarkovsky reveals his filmmaking philosophy and his admiration of films by, among others, Robert Bresson, Jean Vigo, Michelangelo Antonioni, Federico Fellini, Sergei Parajanov, and Ingmar Bergman.

The film was screened in the Un Certain Regard section at the 1995 Cannes Film Festival.

Similar documentaries
This is the only documentary about Andrei Tarkovsky which is also co-directed by Tarkovsky, although several dozen other documentaries about him have been produced. Most notable are One Day in the Life of Andrei Arsenevich by Chris Marker, Moscow Elegy by Alexander Sokurov, The Recall by Tarkovsky's son Andrei Jr., and Regi Andrej Tarkovskij (Directed by Andrei Tarkovsky) by Michal Leszczylowski, the editor of Tarkovsky's The Sacrifice. Tarkovsky has also been featured in numerous documentaries about the history of cinema or the craft and art of filmmaking.

References

External links
 
 Tarkovsky's diary at Nostalghia.com

1983 films
Autobiographical documentary films
Films directed by Andrei Tarkovsky
1980s Italian-language films
1980s Russian-language films
Italian documentary films
Documentary films about films
1983 documentary films
Films with screenplays by Tonino Guerra
1980s Italian films